Why Do Fools Fall in Love is the twelfth studio album by American R&B singer Diana Ross, released on September 14, 1981 by RCA Records. It was Ross' first of six albums released by the label during the decade. It peaked at No. 15 in the United States (No. 4 R&B), No. 17 in the United Kingdom and the top ten in Sweden, Norway and the Netherlands.

Background
Why Do Fools Fall in Love was the first album Ross recorded after leaving the Motown label, when she signed a $20 million deal with RCA. Originally, Nile Rodgers and Bernard Edwards were slated to produce the follow-up to the platinum Diana (1980) album. However, their schedules were filled with commitments to also produce Debbie Harry's solo debut album KooKoo (1981), Johnny Mathis and another Chic album. Ross had given her word to RCA president Robert Summers to deliver an album for the 1981 holiday selling season.

The album was the first to be produced by Ross herself, and it became her second RIAA-certified platinum album. It was also certified gold in the UK and Canada.

After Ross returned "Why Do Fools Fall in Love" to the Top Ten in 1981, a major controversy concerning Frankie Lymon's estate ensued. Three women each were involved in lawsuits and counter-lawsuits over Lymon's copyrights and royalties, claiming to be Lymon's rightful widow. The string of court cases led to the making of the 1998 film Why Do Fools Fall in Love.

Ross embarked on a world tour in support of the album.

The album was remastered and re-released on September 2, 2014 by Funky Town Grooves, with bonus material.

Singles
The album includes the US top 10 hits "Why Do Fools Fall in Love" - a cover of the 1950s Frankie Lymon & the Teenagers classic - and the rock-flavoured "Mirror Mirror".

It also includes "Work That Body", co-written by Ross with Paul Jabara and Ray Chew which was a top 10 hit in the UK and top 15 in the Netherlands. "It's Never Too Late" was also released as a single in some international territories.

Also included on the album is a solo version of "Endless Love", which was a number one duet with Lionel Richie from earlier that year, as well as a version of another 1950s rock & roll classic, "Sweet Nothings" originally recorded by Brenda Lee.

Track listing

Personnel
Credits are adapted from the Why Do Fools Fall in Love liner notes.

Musicians

 Diana Ross – lead vocals (all tracks), backing vocals (1-4, 6-9)
 Rob Mounsey – acoustic piano (1)
 Ray Chew – Rhodes (1, 6), acoustic piano (2-5, 7-9), arrangements (2-5, 8, 9)
 Pat Rebillot – acoustic piano (4)
 Ed Walsh – synthesizers (4)
 Leon Pendarvis – Rhodes (5, 7), arrangements (7)
 Ron Frangipane – acoustic piano (6), synthesizers (6), arrangements (6)
 Bob Kulick – guitar (1), electric guitar (3)
 Eric Gale – electric guitar (1, 2, 5-8) rhythm guitar (3)
 Jeff Mironov – electric guitar (1, 4-7, 9) rhythm guitar (3)
 Neil Jason – bass (1, 3-7, 9)
 Francisco Centeno – bass (2, 8)
 Yogi Horton – drums (all tracks)
 Ralph MacDonald – percussion (1, 3, 5-7, 9)
 George Young – tenor saxophone (1)
 Don Brooks – harmonica (2)
 Michael Brecker – tenor saxophone (7)
 Bert DeCoteaux – horn and string arrangements (1)
 Paul Riser – horn and string arrangements (2, 4, 5, 6, 8)
 Randy Brecker – horn arrangements (3, 7)
 Lamar Alsop – concertmaster (1, 2, 4-6, 8)
 Lionel Richie – lead and backing vocals (4)
 Margaret Dorn - backing vocals (5, 9)
 Leata Galloway – backing vocals (5, 9)
 Millie Whiteside – backing vocals (5, 9)

Production
 Producer – Diana Ross
 Production assistance – Sephra Herman
 Production manager – Matt Murphy
 Engineer – Larry Alexander
 Assistant engineer – Dave Greenberg
 Recorded at the Power Station (New York, NY).
 Mastered by Ted Jensen at Sterling Sound (New York, NY).
 Inside photography – Claude Mougin
 Cover photo – Douglas Kirkland

Charts

Certifications

Notes

References

External links
 

1981 albums
Diana Ross albums
Albums arranged by Paul Riser
Capitol Records albums
RCA Records albums